Joanne Froggatt (born 23 August 1980) is a British actress. From 2010 to 2015, she portrayed Anna Bates in the ITV period drama series Downton Abbey. For this role, she received three Emmy nominations for Outstanding Supporting Actress in a Drama Series, and won the Golden Globe Award for Best Supporting Actress on Television in 2014. From 2017 to 2020, she starred in the ITV drama series Liar.

Froggatt's early television appearances include Coronation Street (1997–1998), Bad Girls (1999), dinnerladies (1999) and A Touch of Frost (2001). She went on to star in the television films Danielle Cable: Eyewitness (2003), See No Evil: The Moors Murders (2006) and Murder in the Outback (2007), before winning the British Independent Film Award for Most Promising Newcomer for her leading role in the 2010 film In Our Name.

Early life and education
Froggatt was born and brought up in the village of Littlebeck in North Yorkshire. Her parents, Ann and Keith Froggatt, having run a corner shop, next started a rare-breed sheep farm on a smallholding near Whitby. Joanne has likened her childhood setting to the backdrop of Emily Brontë's classic novel Wuthering Heights. Froggatt initially joined a drama group in Scarborough, and then left her family home at the age of 13 to attend the Redroofs Theatre School in Maidenhead, Berkshire.

Career
In 1996, Froggatt made her TV debut in the long-running ITV drama The Bill, and shortly afterwards landed the role of teenage mother Zoe Tattersall in Coronation Street. She left the program in 1998, when her character was written out. In 1999, she appeared in the first four episodes of the first series of prison drama Bad Girls, portraying teenage mother Rachel Hicks.

In 2003, Froggatt played the leading role in the controversial one-off drama Danielle Cable: Eyewitness, based on the true story of a teenage girl who witnessed the murder of her boyfriend in a reputed road rage attack. While researching the role, she met Cable, who later contacted her to commend her on her portrayal. The film earned a BAFTA TV Award nomination for Best Single Drama.

Froggatt played the role of Angelique Mahy in the ITV mini-series Island at War, which tells the story of the German occupation of the Channel Islands. It aired on 11 July 2004. In the same year, she played Myra in the BBC Radio 4 drama My Turn to Make the Tea by Monica Dickens.

Froggatt starred as a main character in the drama Missing, made by SMG Productions in 2006, alongside Gregor Fisher. The two-part thriller was not broadcast on STV until November 2008, because ITV had changed its format to 60-minute time slots and Missing was two 90-minute time slots.

Also in 2006, Froggatt played the sister of Myra Hindley in the ITV drama See No Evil: The Moors Murders. She later appeared in another controversial role as the title character in Joanne Lees: Murder in the Outback, which first aired on Channel Ten in Australia on 18 March 2007, and was screened in Britain on ITV on 8 April 2007. The role involved the depiction of a real-life kidnap, in which Froggatt had to perform scenes tied up with tape around her mouth as a gag. She appeared on the London stage in the adaptation of All About My Mother in the part of Sister Rosa, which ran from July to November 2007 at the Old Vic Theatre.

Froggatt portrayed Kate, a peasant, in the third season of the BBC TV series Robin Hood.
She played Hannah in Spooks: Code 9, and features in the BBC Radio adaptation of Solaris as Rheya. In May 2009, she played Kelly in the BBC drama Moving On.

On 25 September 2009, Froggatt played the title role in the BBC Radio Four play I Am Emma Humphreys. On 3 October of that year, Froggatt played Princess Yvonne in the BBC Radio Four Saturday play The Von Trapps and Me.

On 15 April 2010, Froggatt appeared opposite Lee Ingleby in the BBC Radio Four play The Disappearance by Peter Walley. In her film début, In Our Name, Froggatt played Suzy, a soldier suffering from post-traumatic stress disorder. She garnered critical acclaim for her performance, and won Best Newcomer at the British Independent Film Awards.

Starting in 2010, Froggatt appeared in Downton Abbey as Anna, lady's maid to Lady Mary Crawley, for which she received an Emmy nomination in both 2012 and 2014. On 11 January 2015, she was awarded the Golden Globe for Best Supporting Actress in a Series, Mini-Series, or TV Movie for the role.

On 25 December 2010, Froggatt appeared in the Royle Family Christmas special, "Joe's Crackers", as Saskia, the girlfriend of Antony Royle. Despite having been mentioned by name in earlier episodes, this was the first time that Saskia had appeared in person. Froggatt starred in John Donnelly's play The Knowledge at the Bush Theatre, West London, from 12 January to 19 February 2011.

Along with Downton Abbey in 2013, Froggatt had roles in the comedy drama based on Irvine Welsh's novel Filth, in the thriller uwantme2killhim?, and an indie directed by Uberto Pasolini, Still Life.

In 2015, she played Wendy in the new Bob the Builder series, voicing her in both the UK and US versions. In 2016, she starred in a two-part ITV mini-series titled Dark Angel, based on the true story of Victorian poisoner Mary Ann Cotton. Also in 2016, she co-starred in a dramatisation of a real-life story, "Starfish", as Nic, wife of Tom Ray.

In 2017, Froggatt appeared in the lead role of schoolteacher Laura Neilson in the six-part thriller mini-series Liar on ITV. Her character awakens, convinced that she was raped by respected surgeon Andrew Earlham (Ioan Gruffudd), who is also the father of one of her students, even though she cannot remember the incident, nor does forensic evidence bear out her version of events. The series aired in the US on SundanceTV.

Froggatt began performances on 25 February 2019 as Frances Thorpe in the thriller Alys, Always, at the Bridge Theatre in London. The play was directed by Nicholas Hytner and written by Lucinda Coxon, and based on the book by Harriet Lane.

In 2022, she starred in Last Light, an apocalyptic thriller TV series on Peacock.

Personal life
Froggatt married long-time boyfriend James Cannon in a private ceremony in October 2012. In February 2020, she confirmed they had separated.

In 2013, Froggatt became an ambassador for global children's charity Plan UK's "Because I Am a Girl" campaign.

Filmography

Film

Television

Radio

Awards and nominations

References

External links

 

1980 births
Living people
English soap opera actresses
Actors from Whitby
English television actresses
English voice actresses
Actors from Scarborough, North Yorkshire
People educated at Redroofs Theatre School
English film actresses
Actresses from Yorkshire
English stage actresses
20th-century English actresses
21st-century English actresses
Best Supporting Actress Golden Globe (television) winners
English child actresses
English radio actresses